Whitesand River may refer to:

 Whitesand River (Hewitson River), Ontario, Canada
 Whitesand River (Lake Nipigon), Ontario, Canada
 Whitesand River (Saskatchewan), Saskatchewan, Canada